Aethes westratei is a species of moth of the family Tortricidae. It is found in the United States, where it has been recorded from Michigan.

The ground color of the forewings is cream, suffused with brownish scales, although it is suffused with tawny scales in the basal area. The markings are brown. The hindwings are olive brown. Adults have been recorded on wing in September, probably in one generation per year.

Etymology
The species is named in honor of William P. Westrate.

References

westratei
Moths described in 2002
Moths of North America